Brocchinia steyermarkii is a species of plant in the genus Brocchinia. This species is native to Venezuela and Guyana.

References

steyermarkii
Flora of Guyana
Flora of Venezuela
Guayana Highlands
Plants described in 1951